State Route 103 (SR 103) is a primary state highway in the U.S. state of Virginia.  The state highway runs  from the North Carolina state line, where the highway continues as North Carolina Highway 103 (NC 103), east to SR 8 at Five Forks.  In conjunction with NC 103 and SR 8, SR 103 connects Mount Airy, North Carolina with Stuart, the county seat of Patrick County.

Route description

SR 103 begins at the North Carolina state line southwest of Claudville.  The highway continues southwest as NC 103 toward Slate Mountain, Flat Rock, and Mount Airy.  SR 103 heads northeast as two-lane undivided Claudville Highway, which crosses the Dan River.  In Claudville, the state highway intersects SR 773 (Ararat Highway), which heads west through the foothills to Ararat.  SR 103 heads east out of Claudville as Dry Pond Highway.  The state highway crosses the Little Dan River and passes through the hamlets of Dry Pond and Peters Creek before reaching its eastern terminus at SR 8 (Salem Highway) at Five Forks between Stuart and the North Carolina state line.

Major intersections

References

External links

Virginia Highways Project: VA 103

103
State Route 103